Gause Independent School District is a public school district based in the community of Gause, Texas (USA).

Gause ISD was founded in 1905. The district has one school that serves students in grades pre-kindergarten through eight.

In 2009, the school district was rated "recognized" by the Texas Education Agency.

References

External links
Gause ISD - official site.

School districts in Milam County, Texas
School districts established in 1905